Lois Irene Kimsey Marshall (born Lois Irene Kimsey; May 9, 1873 – January 6, 1958) was the wife of Thomas R. Marshall, the 28th vice president of the United States. During her husband's tenure she held the unofficial position of the second lady of the United States from 1913 to 1921. She served also as first lady of Indiana during her husband's Governorship (1909–1913).

Biography
Lois Kimsey was the daughter of William Edward Kimsey and Elizabeth Dale. Lois married Thomas Marshall, 19 years her senior, on October 2, 1895.

She became involved in charitable activities in Washington, D.C. and spent time working at the Diet Kitchen Welfare Center providing free meals to impoverished children. In 1917, she became acquainted with a mother of newborn twins, one of whom was chronically ill. The child's parents were unable to get adequate treatment for their son's condition. Lois Marshall formed a close bond with the baby, who was named Clarence Ignatius Morrison, and offered to take him and help him find treatment.

The Marshalls had been unable to have children, but they never officially adopted Morrison because they believed that to go through the procedure while his parents were still alive would appear unusual to the public. They instead made a special arrangement with his parents.  Morrison lived with the Marshalls for the rest of his life. In correspondence they referred to him as Morrison Marshall, but in person they called him Izzy. Lois took him to see many doctors and spent all her available time trying to nurse him back to health, but his condition worsened and he died in February 1920, just before his fourth birthday.

After her husband died in 1925, Lois moved to Phoenix, Arizona and lived on her husband's pension and the sales of his memoirs. She died at her Phoenix home on January 6, 1958, at age 84. She was interred next to her husband in Crown Hill Cemetery, Indianapolis, Indiana.

References

External links

 

|-

1873 births
1958 deaths
Burials at Crown Hill Cemetery
First Ladies and Gentlemen of Indiana
People from Angola, Indiana
People from Phoenix, Arizona
Second ladies of the United States